The 2022–23 California Golden Bears men's basketball team represented the University of California, Berkeley, in the 2022–23 NCAA Division I men's basketball season. This was Mark Fox's fourth year as head coach at California. The Golden Bears played their home games at Haas Pavilion as members of the Pac-12 Conference. The team began the season with a record of 0–12, the worst in history for any Power Five team.

Cal finished the year 3–29.  Fox was fired from the school on March 9, 2023 the day after their 1st round loss in the Pac-12 Tournament.  He finished his 4 year career at California with a 38–87 record.

Previous season
The Golden Bears finished the 2021–22 season with a record of 12–20, 5–15 in Pac-12 play to finish in tenth place. They lost to Washington State in the first round of the Pac-12 tournament.

Off-season

Departures

Source:

Incoming Transfers

Source:

2022 recruiting class

Roster

Schedule and results
The Golden Bears were the first men's basketball team from a power conference—defined for this purpose as a member of a Power Five conference or the Big East Conference—to start a season 0–7 in the last 40 years. Louisville would match this feat three days later. Cal's record has since dropped to 0–11.

Main source:

|-
!colspan=12 style=| Exhibition
 
|-
!colspan=12 style=| Regular season

|-
!colspan=12 style=| Pac-12 tournament

Source:

Notes

References

California Golden Bears men's basketball seasons
California
California Golden
California Golden